Muhammad Mohsin Siddiqui was a Pakistani politician and businessman who was the founder of Pakland Cement. He was the member of the Senate of Pakistan from 1985 to 1990.

Siddiqui was murdered in 1990 following ethnic clash during 1988 Hyderabad, Sindh massacre.

References

1990 deaths
Members of the Senate of Pakistan
Pakistani company founders
Pakistani industrialists
Muhajir people
People from Karachi
Assassinated Pakistani people
Muttahida Qaumi Movement politicians